The 1916 Maine gubernatorial election took place on September 11, 1916.

Incumbent Democratic Governor Oakley C. Curtis was defeated for re-election by Republican candidate Carl Milliken.

Results

Notes

References

Gubernatorial
1916
Maine
September 1916 events